Olearia incana is a species of flowering plant in the family Asteraceae and is endemic to southern Australia. It is a shrub with narrowly elliptic or wedge-shaped leaves and white and pale yellow, daisy-like inflorescences.

Description
The edges of the leaves are sometimes coarsely toothed and both side are covered with woolly, greyish hairs. Flowering occurs from June to November and the fruit is a silky-hairy achene, the pappus with 37 to 56 bristles.

Taxonomy
This olearia was first formally described in 1985 by David Alan Cooke who gave it the name Olearia pimeleoides subsp. incana in the Journal of the Adelaide Botanic Gardens, based on material collected by Peter Bruce Copley near Maralinga in 1969. In 2008, Nicholas Sèan Lander raised the subspecies to species status as Olearia incana in the journal Nuytsia. The specific epithet (incana) means "greyish", referring to the foliage.

Distribution and habitat
Olearia incana grows in open woodland and forest, on flats and sandplains in the south-east of Western Australia, the southern half of South Australia, eastern Victoria and western New South Wales.

Conservation status
This daisy bush is listed as "not threatened" by the Department of Biodiversity, Conservation and Attractions.

References

incana
Eudicots of Western Australia
Flora of South Australia
Flora of New South Wales
Flora of Victoria (Australia)
Plants described in 1985